Parotocinclus planicauda is a species of catfish in the family Loricariidae. It is native to South America, where it occurs in the Suaçuí Pequeno River in Brazil. The species reaches 4.3 cm (1.7 inches) SL. It can reportedly be distinguished from its congeners by the presence of a caudal peduncle with an almost quadrangular cross-section.

References 

Loricariidae
Catfish of South America
Fish described in 2003
Otothyrinae